Code Parish is an administrative unit of Bauska Municipality in the Semigallia region of Latvia.

Towns, villages and settlements of Code parish

Gallery

Notable people 
 Atis Slakteris

Parishes of Latvia
Bauska Municipality
Semigallia